Fresh Complaint: Stories is a 2017 collection of short stories by American writer Jeffrey Eugenides.

Contents
It comprises ten stories, eight of which had previously been "published in magazines and literary journals between 1989 and 2013".

Audiobook
The audiobook is read by Jeffrey Eugenides, Ari Fliakos and Cynthia Nixon.

References

2017 short story collections
American short story collections
Farrar, Straus and Giroux books